Selena Lee Sze-wa (born 12 February 1981), former stage name Selena Lee Sze-Wan, is a Hong Kong-born Canadian actress and former beauty pageant contestant.

After participating in the 2003 Miss Hong Kong Pageant, Lee had signed an artiste contract with TVB and filmed numerous TVB dramas. She left TVB in 2019 and announced in May 2019 that she will be managed by American talent agency Authentic for work in North America. In September 2019, Lee earned critical acclaim for her dual role as Alex and Coco in the supernatural romance drama Barrack O'Karma and won the Most Popular Female Character award at the TVB Anniversary Awards. In June 2020, she signed an artiste contract with Shaw Brothers Pictures for work in Hong Kong and South-Eastern Asia.

Early life 
Born in Hong Kong, Selena Lee immigrated with her parents to Toronto in 1988. She attended the University of Toronto, earning a Bachelor of Business Commerce with major in Accounting in 2010.

Lee had also had achieved Grade 8 piano.

Career 
Selena Lee entered the 2003 Miss Hong Kong Pageant as an overseas contestant, winning Miss Photogenic and Miss Talent. She subsequently signed with the broadcasting giant TVB and made her acting debut in the drama The Last Breakthrough.

In 2014, Lee portrayed Jessica Tan in the Singaporean sitcom Spouse for House. She won the credit award for best actress in comedy in Asian Television Award.

In 2017, Lee won the Best Actress awards at the European Cinematography Awards and Los Angeles Film Awards with her role in the American short film Once More.

In 2018, Lee participated in Canadian television crime drama Blood and Water for which she was nominated for Best Supporting Actress at the 7th Canadian Screen Awards.

In April 2019, Lee announced that she would not be renewing her contract with TVB, with intentions to pursue opportunities internationally. It was announced in May 2019 that she would be managed by American talent agency Authentic for work in North America.

In September 2019, Lee portrayed the 2010s flight attendant Alex Cheung and the 1960s hostess Coco Yeung in the TVB supernatural drama Barrack O'Karma, for which she earned critical acclaim and became a strong contender for Best Actress. At the 2019 TVB Anniversary Awards, she won the Most Popular Onscreen Partnership award with her Barrack O'Karma co-actor Joel Chan. Nominated for the fourth time for Most Popular Female Character, Lee won the award alongside Miriam Yeung for her dual role as Alex and Coco. She was placed among the top 5 nominees for Best Actress as well.

Lee's last drama at TVB, Forensic Heroes IV, aired in February 2020. She released her first single, Second Love, with her Forensic Heroes IV co-actor Gabriel Harrison and won music awards for the single. Lee signed an artiste contract with Shaw Brothers Pictures for work in Hong Kong and South-Eastern Asia as well. In August 2020, she returned to TVB to film the sequel Barrack O'Karma 1968. The drama was aired in April 2022. She is the only one who entered top 5 for both TVB Anniversary Awards 2022  best actress and most favorite best actress in Malaysia category. Both drama series entered the finalist of best actress in a leading role in Asian Television Awards and People's Choice Television Award in 2020 and 2022 respectively.

She released her first album in September 2022 and completed the filming of the remaking international film - Tape.

Personal life 
In 2015, Lee announced on her Weibo blog that she had decided to change her Chinese stage name, Lee Sze Wan (李詩韻), back to her birth name, Lee Sze Wa (李施嬅), in memory of her grandmother, who had passed away that year.

Selena Lee is best friends with Myolie Wu, Nancy Wu, Paisley Wu, Elaine Yiu and Mandy Wong. They had formed the friendship group “胡說八道會” and filmed a travel show together.

Due to their common interest in long-distance running, Lee along with Benjamin Yuen, Joel Chan, Brian Tse, Jack Wu, Nancy Wu, Paisley Wu, Elaine Yiu and Mandy Wong formed the group "Crazy Runner".

In February 2021, Lee announced via social media that she is engaged to Anson Cha, a fitness coach and personal trainer.

On 31 March 2022, Lee revealed that she has autoimmune disease. She has stopped working since late 2021 and is currently receiving treatment.

Television and Film

Variety programmes
Hosting

Guest

Advertisements

Album

Singles

Nominations and awards

References

External links
Selena Lee Official Instagram

|-
! colspan="3" style="background: #DAA520;" | Miss Hong Kong

Actresses from Toronto
Hong Kong emigrants to Canada
Hong Kong film actresses
Hong Kong television actresses
Living people
Naturalized citizens of Canada
TVB actors
University of Toronto alumni
21st-century Hong Kong actresses
1981 births